Prodan Rupar (1815–1875) was one of the most prominent leaders of the Herzegovina Uprising (1875–77). Experience from the previous Herzegovina Uprising (1852–62) helped him to successfully lead the later uprising.

Life

Preparation for the uprising 

The rebel leaders in Herzegovina, Prodan Rupar, Petar Radović, Jovan Gutić, Simon Zečević, Ilija Stevanović and Trivko Grubačić had meetings in the months of August and September 1874, during which they planned the uprising. They made decisions regarding the preparation of arms, places of refuge for people, and future support for the Principality of Montenegro. 

The preparations were finished by Spring 1875. The group entered negotiations with Montenegrin Grand Duke Nikola Petrović in October. The Ottomans heard of the negotiations and tried to arrest the ringleaders, who fled into Montenegro in the winter of 1874. The Great Powers intervened in 1875 and asked the Sublime Porte for pardons and amnesty for the ringleaders. This prompted the Great Eastern Crisis.

See also 

 Montenegrin–Ottoman War (1876–78)

References

 Encyclopedia of Yugoslavia JLZ Zagreb in 1971. Volume 8 (Serbia - F). p. 625

1815 births
1877 deaths
Serbs of Bosnia and Herzegovina
People from Nevesinje
Serb rebels
Rebels from the Ottoman Empire